Matthew Randall (born 24 April 1978 in Invercargill, New Zealand) is a New Zealand racing cyclist. He won a bronze medal at the 2002 Commonwealth Games in the 4000m team pursuit riding with Greg Henderson, Hayden Roulston and Lee Vertongen.

References

Cyclists at the 2004 Summer Olympics
New Zealand male cyclists
Olympic cyclists of New Zealand
Commonwealth Games bronze medallists for New Zealand
New Zealand track cyclists
1978 births
Living people
Cyclists from Invercargill
Commonwealth Games medallists in cycling
Cyclists at the 2002 Commonwealth Games
21st-century New Zealand people
Medallists at the 2002 Commonwealth Games